"Set It Off" is a song by American hip hop duo Young Gunz, released in May 2005, as the lead single from their second studio album Brothers from Another. The song features vocals and production from American musician Swizz Beatz. The song's music video, which was directed by Ben Mor, contains a portion of the single's B-side, titled "Tonite", towards the end of the video. The single peaked at number 52 on the Billboard Hot R&B/Hip-Hop Songs chart.

Charts

References

2005 singles
Swizz Beatz songs
Song recordings produced by Swizz Beatz
Songs written by Swizz Beatz
Songs written by Young Chris
Roc-A-Fella Records singles
Young Gunz songs
Def Jam Recordings singles